François-Émile André (August 22, 1871 – March 10, 1933) was a French architect, artist, and furniture designer. He was the son of the architect of Charles André and the father of two other architects, Jacques and Michel André.

Life and career
André was born in Nancy, France.  He studied architecture at the École des Beaux-Arts in Paris.

From 1894 to 1900, he traveled to Tunisia, Sicily, Egypt, Persia, and Ceylon, during which time he produced numerous notebooks that included drawings, watercolors, and photographs. He had already worked in the studio of his father, Charles, André, then with Eugène Vallin, with whom he developed the principles of Art Nouveau.

He was slated to become a professor of applied arts and architecture with the École de Nancy, and is considered to be one of the group's principal architects. He built more than a dozen Art Nouveau buildings in Nancy between 1901 and 1912.

References

External links

Musée de l'École de Nancy

1871 births
1933 deaths
People from Nancy, France
École des Beaux-Arts alumni
Art Nouveau architects
Art Nouveau designers
20th-century French architects
French draughtsmen
French furniture designers
Members of the École de Nancy